John Bailey (1786June 26, 1835) was an American politician who served as a member of the United States House of Representatives from Massachusetts from 1824 to 1831.

Biography 
Born in Stoughton, Massachusetts (in that part of Stoughton which later became Canton).  Bailey graduated from Brown University in 1807. Bailey worked as a tutor and librarian in Providence, Rhode Island from 1807 until 1814. Bailey was elected to the Massachusetts House of Representatives and served from 1814 to 1817; he served as a clerk in the Department of State in Washington, D.C. from 1817 until 1823.

Bailey was elected a member of the American Antiquarian Society in 1816.

Congress 
Bailey presented credentials as a Member-elect to the Eighteenth Congress, but his election was contested on residency requirements. A House resolution on March 18, 1824 declared he was not entitled to the seat.

Upon returning to Canton, Bailey was elected as an Adams-Clay Republican; his subsequent re-elections allowed him to serve the Nineteenth and Twentieth Congresses. During his tenure Bailey chaired the Committee on Expenditures in the Department of State.

Bailey ran as an Anti-Jacksonian in the Twenty-first Congress but was not a candidate for renomination in 1830. He was a member of the Massachusetts State senate, 1831–1834, and ran as the unsuccessful Anti-Masonic candidate for Governor of Massachusetts in 1834.

Death 
He died in Dorchester, Massachusetts the following year.

See also

References

1786 births
1835 deaths
19th-century American politicians
Anti-Masonic Party politicians from Massachusetts
Brown University alumni
Democratic-Republican Party members of the United States House of Representatives from Massachusetts
Massachusetts National Republicans
Members of the American Antiquarian Society
Members of the Massachusetts House of Representatives
National Republican Party members of the United States House of Representatives
People from Stoughton, Massachusetts
Politicians from Providence, Rhode Island